Suzanna Mukherjee is an Indian actress.

Personal life 
Mukherjee is a half Bengali and half Ukrainian film and television actress. Her father is Bengali whereas her mother is of half Ukrainian and Russian origin. She was born in Ukraine and completed her schooling in Bhilai where her mother runs a fashion boutique. She considers Amitabh Bachchan, Priyanka Chopra, Tabu as her favorite actor and actress from Bollywood, however she considers Sonam Kapoor as a style icon, who inspires her. She did her MBA in Finance from Pune. Being born in a multi cultural family she knows several languages including Ukrainian, Russian, Bengali, Hindi, English, Marathi.

Career

Television 
She was one of the contestants in MTV Roadies Hell Down Under, which was the sixth edition of the reality show but she was eliminated in the 6th episode.  Apart from Roadies she has also taken part in another reality show Emotional Atyachar.

Film 
In the film she is set to star opposite Bollywood actor Emraan Hashmi in Raaz Reboot also called Raaz 4, the 4th installment of the horror franchise.

Web series 
On 21 December 2016, she started working on a new web series Married Woman Diaries on Sony LIV and YouTube.

Filmography

Television
2009 - MTV Roadies Hell Down Under, a reality show on MTV as herself
2009 - Basera on NDTV Imagine as Ujjwala Parikh
2009-10 - Roomies on Channel V as Mira

Films
2012 - Tutiya Dil as Rhea
2014 - Trip to Bhangarh as Kavya 
2014 - 22 Yards as Shonali
2015 - Badmashiyaan as Nari
2016 - Raaz Reboot as Shreya
2016 - Mona Darling as Mona

Web series 
 2017 - Married Woman Diaries

References

Living people
Indian film actresses
Indian television actresses
Indian soap opera actresses
Indian web series actresses
Year of birth missing (living people)
People from Bhilai
MTV Roadies contestants
Actresses in Hindi cinema
Actresses in Hindi television
Actresses of European descent in Indian films
Indian people of Ukrainian descent
Indian people of Russian descent
21st-century Indian actresses